Xiao Han may refer to:

 Xiao Han (Liao dynasty) (蕭翰; died 949), Liao dynasty general
 Xiao Han (minister) (肖寒; 1926–2019), Minister of Coal Industry of China
 Xiao Han (skater) (肖涵; born 1994), Chinese speed skater
 Xiaohan (lyricist) (小寒), Singaporean lyricist

See also
 Xiaohan (disambiguation)